Robert Mark (1917–2010) was an English police officer.

Robert Mark may also refer to:
 Bob Mark (1937–2006), Australian tennis player
 Robert Mark (Austrian actor) (born 1926), also known as Rudolf Zehetgruber
 Robert Mark (American actor) (born 1934), also known as Rod Dana

See also
 Robert Marc (disambiguation)
 Robert Marks (disambiguation)